Amanpour & Company is a late-night global-affairs interview television program hosted by Christiane Amanpour. The hour-long show premiered on PBS on September 10, 2018, as an expanded version of the CNN International show Amanpour, augmented with  interviews by correspondents at the WNET studios in New York.

History
Following the removal of Charlie Rose in December 2017 after the eponymous host's sexual harassment scandal, CNN offered Amanpour to PBS to air in its place. The CNN International show aired in its exact same 30-minute format minus the CNN branding and commercials from December 2017 until September 2018 as Amanpour on PBS. From shortly after PBS picked up the show, plans were in the works for an expanded PBS version of the program. The result was Amanpour & Company which was announced in May 2018 with an expanded one-hour running time and a third interview block conducted by correspondents from WNET in New York. Correspondent Alicia Menendez left the show on October 1, 2019, and joined MSNBC.

Correspondents

Current
Walter Isaacson
Michel Martin
Hari Sreenivasan
Ana Cabrera (minor)

Former

 Alicia Menendez (September 10, 2018 – October 1, 2019; moved to MSNBC)

References

External links

 Official website

PBS original programming
2018 American television series debuts
2010s American television talk shows
2020s American television talk shows
English-language television shows
2010s American late-night television series